Poth Jana Nai (English: There's no known way) is a Bangladeshi television drama serial, originally aired on the ATN Bangla from 1 November 2010, to 9 September 2011, with prime slot for Monday, comprising a total 52 episodes. The drama is directed by Syed Zamim and written by Ahmed Zaman Chowdhury.

Plot
The story builds up around an elite family in Dhaka. Shahid and Zahid Mahmood are two sons of late Barrister Arshad Mahmood. Shahid Mahmood, the oldest son is an established and Lawyer, who lives with his wife and mom. Zahid Mahmood is the younger son, who is on the process of getting his law degree. During the first episode, It is shown that Shahid also have an extramarital affair with Shakila, despite being married for a long time. Shakila, facing constant pressure from few powerful real estate businessman, looks to Shahid for legal help. After going to court, the companies faces huge loss due to losing the legal battle, and conspires to kill him. Few days after, Shahid gets into a car accident and dies. Years later, Zahid returns from London as a lawyer, and decides to open an investigation case for his brother's death, while the family decides to get their younger son married to their Shahid's widowed wife, despite their disapproval.

Cast
 Ziaul Faruq Apurba as Shahid Mahmood / Zahid Mahmood
 Sadia Jahan Prova as Yasmeen
 Tanzika Amin as Shakila
 Inamul Haque
 Dilara Zaman
 Syed Hasan Imam
 Atikur Rahman
 Munia Islam
 Raisul Islam
 Monira Mithu
 Nafisa Ferdous

References

Bangladeshi drama television series
Bengali-language television programming in Bangladesh
2010 Bangladeshi television series debuts
2010s Bangladeshi television series
ATN Bangla original programming